Lookout Township is a township in Ellis County, Kansas, USA.  As of the 2010 census, its population was 579.

Geography
According to the USGS, it contains one cemetery, Saint Anthony, at Antonino. The township was the focus of the 1890s gold rush hoax witnessing the short lived settlements of Smoky Hill City and Chetolah.

References

External links
 City-Data.com

Townships in Ellis County, Kansas
Townships in Kansas